Oey (pronounced "wee" ) is a Chinese Indonesian surname of Hokkien origin and Dutch-based, West Java romanization. Literally "yellow", or "golden yellow", its Central Java romanization is Oei, while its pinyin version is Huang. 

Many Indonesians bearing this surname in Indonesia changed it to Indonesian-sounding surnames because of Cabinet Presidium Decision 127 of 1966—an anti-Chinese law that mandated that ethnic Chinese living in Indonesia adopt Indonesian names.

Among Chinese-Malaysians and Singaporeans, the surname is often spelled Ooi or Wee.

Notable people with the surname

Oey
Alexander Oey (born 1960), Dutch film director 
Indrawati Oey (born 1970), New Zealand food scientist
Morgan Oey (born 1990), Indonesian actor
Oey Bian Kong (died 1802), Indonesian bureaucrat 
Oey Djie San (died 1925), Indonesian bureaucrat and landlord 
Oey Giok Koen (died 1912), Indonesian bureaucrat and landlord 
Oey Khe Tay (died 1897), Indonesian bureaucrat and landlord 
Oey Liauw Kong (1799−1865), Indonesian official and landlord 
Oey Tamba Sia (1827−1856), Indonesian playboy 
Oey Thai Lo (1788−1838), Indonesian tycoon 
Regan Oey (born 1998), Canadian actor
Sally Oey (born 1957), American astronomer 
Taktin Oey (born 1986), American composer

Oei
David Oei (born 1950), Hong Kong-born American pianist
Oei Ek Tjhong (1921−2019), Indonesian businessman 
Oei Hok Tiang (born 1932), Indonesian boxer
Oei Hong Leong (born 1947), Singaporean businessman 
Oei Hui-lan (1889−1912), Indonesian socialite and First Lady of the Republic of China
Oei Hwie Siong (born 1939), Indonesian businessman 
Oei Hwie Tjhong (born 1941), Indonesian billionaire 
Oei Liana (born 1952), American former swimmer 
Oei Tiong Ham (1866−1924), Indonesian tycoon
Oei Tjie Sien (1835−1900), Chinese-born Indonesian tycoon
Pam Oei (born 1972), Singaporean actress

See also
 Legislation on Chinese Indonesians

References

Indonesian-language surnames
Hokkien-language surnames